Esanda was an Australian finance company. Founded in 1955 by the English, Scottish & Australian Bank, it became a subsidiary of the Australia & New Zealand Banking Group in 1987. The brand was retired in 2019.

History
Esanda was established in October 1955 as the commercial financing division of the English, Scottish & Australian Bank (ES&A). It became a subsidiary of the ANZ Bank after it merged with ES&A in 1970. After ANZ acquired the Bank of Adelaide in 1979 and the National Mutual Royal Bank in 1990, the respective finance divisions were incorporated into Esanda.
 
In 2016, the dealer finance portfolio was sold to Macquarie Group. In March 2019, ANZ retired the Esanda brand.

References

External links
Company website

Australia and New Zealand Banking Group
Defunct financial services companies of Australia
Financial services companies established in 1955
Financial services companies disestablished in 2019
1955 establishments in Australia
2019 disestablishments in Australia